James Glennister Cox  (born 1 October 1945) is a former Tasmanian Labor politician and member of the Tasmanian House of Assembly who represented the electorate of Bass. He held office from 1989 to 1992, and again from 1996 to 2010.

Before entering Parliament, Cox co-hosted The Saturday Night Show on TNT-9 with Graeme Goodings and was a radio announcer in northern Tasmania.  Cox won Logie Awards for most popular male on Tasmanian television in 1979 and 1981.

Cox ran in the 1989 Tasmanian state election. He defeated Labor incumbent Gill James and was seated in the House of Assembly.

In 1989, Tasmanian media magnate Edmund Rouse, Chairman of forestry enterprise Gunns, attempted to bribe Cox with $110,000 to cross the floor of parliament in an attempt to prevent Labor forming government in alliance with the five Green Independents, and attempting to secure the return of the pro-logging Liberal Party government of Robin Gray. Cox reported the bribery attempt to police, and ultimately Rouse served 18 months in jail.

James ran against Cox again in 1992, defeating him. In 1996, Cox ran against, and defeated, Tasmanian Green Lance Armstrong. Cox was re-elected again in the 2002 and 2006 elections. He did not run in the 2010 elections and retired.

Cox was made a member of the Order of Australia in 2017.

References

External links

Jim Cox's maiden speech to parliament

1945 births
Living people
Members of the Tasmanian House of Assembly
Australian radio presenters
Australian television presenters
Australian Labor Party members of the Parliament of Tasmania
21st-century Australian politicians
Members of the Order of Australia